Lucy Dillon (born 1974) is a British writer of romance novels. In 2010, her novel Lost Dogs and Lonely Hearts won the Romantic Novel of the Year Award by the Romantic Novelists' Association. Her fifth novel, A Hundred Pieces of Me won the 2015 RoNA Award for the Best Contemporary Romantic Novel.

Biography
Lucy Dillon was born in 1974 in Cumbria, England, UK. She now divides her time between London and the Wye Valley.

Bibliography
 The Ballroom Class (2008)
 Lost Dogs and Lonely Hearts (2009)
 Walking Back to Happiness (2010)
 The Secret of Happy Ever After (2011)
 A Hundred Pieces of Me (2014)
 One Small Act of Kindness (2015)
 All I Ever Wanted (2016)
 Where the Light Gets In (2018)
 Unexpected Lessons in Love (2019)

References and sources

1974 births
People from Cumbria
Living people
English romantic fiction writers
RoNA Award winners
21st-century British novelists
21st-century English women writers
Women romantic fiction writers
English women novelists